Dam Tang-e Orveh (also Romanized as Dam Tang-e ‘Orveh and Dam Tang Orveh; also known as Dam Tang) is a village in Tayebi-ye Garmsiri-ye Shomali Rural District, in the Central District of Landeh County, Kohgiluyeh and Boyer-Ahmad Province, Iran. At the 2006 census, its population was 27, in 8 families.

References 

Populated places in Landeh County